Central Gippsland or variation, may refer to:

Central Gippsland, a geographic region of the Australian state of Victoria
Shire of Wellington, Victoria, Australia; the administrative district corresponding to the geographic region
Electoral district of Gippsland Central of the Victorian Legislative Assembly for the state of Victoria in Australia

See also

 
 
 Central (disambiguation)
 Gippsland (disambiguation)